Tor Arne Andreassen (born 16 March 1983 in Haugesund) is a Norwegian former footballer who played in defence and midfield for Haugesund.

Career statistics

External links
Guardian's Stats Centre

1983 births
Living people
Norwegian footballers
FK Haugesund players
People from Haugesund
SK Vard Haugesund players
Eliteserien players
Association football midfielders
Sportspeople from Rogaland